Friedrich Eugen, Duke of Württemberg (21 January 1732 – 23 December 1797) was the fourth son of Karl Alexander, Duke of Württemberg, and Princess Maria Augusta of Thurn and Taxis (11 August 1706 – 1 February 1756). He was born in Stuttgart. From 1795 until 1797 he was Duke of Württemberg.

Soldier
After serving with Frederick the Great during the Seven Years' War, he took up residence in 1769 at his family's exclave, the County of Montbéliard, of which he was also made lieutenant-general in March 1786 by his eldest brother, Charles Eugene, Duke of Württemberg, who had begun to come into the inheritance of portions of the County of Limpurg in the 1780s. He bought the castle and lordship of Hochberg in 1779, but re-sold it in 1791 to his brother. The next year he was named governor of the margraviate of Ansbach-Bayreuth by King Frederick William II of Prussia, to whom it had been sold by the last prince of that branch of the House of Hohenzollern. Montbéliard was taken over by the short-lived Rauracian Republic in 1792, then annexed by the French Republic in 1793.

Duke
His elder brothers had only daughters, so following Charles Eugene's death in 1793 and then that of their brother Duke Ludwig Eugen (1731–1795), Frederick Eugene became reigning duke until his own death two years later. He acquiesced to the Treaty of Paris (7 August 1796) (de) with revolutionary France, in which his claims to Montbéliard and all other territories on the left bank of the Rhine River were renounced. Frederick Eugene retained, however, France's recognition of the integrity of the duchy of Württemberg itself.

Marriage and children

Frederick Eugene married Friederike Sophia Dorothea of Brandenburg-Schwedt, a niece of Frederick the Great, by whom he had twelve children:
 Frederick I (6 November 1754 – 30 October 1816), his successor, who would later become the first King of Württemberg;
 Louis (30 August 1756 – 20 September 1817), commander of the Grand Duchy of Lithuania's army, married Polish princess Maria Anna Czartoryska;
 Eugene (21 November 1758 – 20 June 1822);
 Sophie Dorothea (25 October 1759 – 5 November 1828), married to Paul I, Emperor of Russia and became Empress Marie Feodorovna;
 William Frederick Philip (27 December 1761 – 10 August 1830); father of Wilhelm, 1st Duke of Urach;
 Ferdinand Frederick Augustus (22 October 1763 – 20 January 1834), married firstly Princess Albertine of Schwarzburg-Sondershausen (1771-1829) and secondly Princess Pauline von Metternich-Winneburg (1771-1855), sister of Klemens Wenzel, Prince von Metternich;
 Friederike Elisabeth Amalie (27 July 1765 – 24 November 1785), married to Peter I, Grand Duke of Oldenburg;
 Elisabeth Wilhelmine Luise (21 April 1767 – 18 February 1790), married to Francis II, Holy Roman Emperor;
 Friederike Wilhelmine Katharina (3 June 1768 – 22 October 1768);
 Charles Frederick Henry (3 May 1770 – 22 August 1791);
 Alexander Frederick Charles (24 April 1771 – 4 July 1833), the founder of the fifth branch of Württemberg, to which today's head of the House, Duke Wilhelm of Württemberg, belongs;
 Charles Henry (3 July 1772 – 28 July 1838), married under the name "Count von Sontheim" in 1798 Christianne-Caroline Alexeï (1779–1853), who was created Baroness von Hochberg und Rottenburg in 1807 and was raised, along with her children, to the rank and title of Countess von Urach on 12 November 1825. Of their five daughters three died young, while Countess Marie von Urach (1802–1882) wed Karl, Prince of Hohenlohe-Kirchberg (1780-1861) in 1821 and Countess Alexandrine von Urach (1803–1884) married Charles, Count Arpeau de Gallatin (1802-1877) in 1825, from whom she was divorced in 1843.

The duke died at Hohenheim, aged 65.

Ancestry

On-line material
 Family tree with portrait
 Posthumous drawing of him as a young man by Adolph Menzel

References

1732 births
1797 deaths
18th-century dukes of Württemberg
Nobility from Stuttgart
Soldiers of the Imperial Circles
Prussian military personnel of the Seven Years' War
Lieutenant generals of Prussia
People of the Silesian Wars
Military personnel from Stuttgart